Falling Creek Falls may refer to:

Falling Creek Falls, a 10-foot waterfall in Columbia County, Florida on a 76-acre property currently jointly managed by the Suwannee River Water Management District and Columbia County
Fall Creek Falls, a large waterfall in Tennessee
Fall Creek Falls (Douglas County, Oregon),  a  waterfall in the North Umpqua River corridor.